This is a list of Directors of the Intelligence Agency (IA) of North Macedonia.

References

Lists of Macedonian people